Events in the year 1986 in Brazil.

Incumbents

Federal government
 President: José Sarney
 Vice President: vacant

Governors 
 Acre: Nabor Júnior (until 15 March); Iolanda Fleming (from 15 March)
 Alagoas: Divaldo Suruagy (till 14 May); José de Medeiros Tavares (from 14 May)
 Amazonas: Gilberto Mestrinho 
 Bahia: João Durval Carneiro 
 Ceará: Gonzaga Mota 
 Espírito Santo: Gerson Camata (until 14 May); José Moraes (from 14 May)
 Goiás: Iris Rezende (till 13 February); Onofre Quinan (from 14 May)
 Maranhão: Luís Rocha 
 Mato Grosso: Julio Campos then Wilmar Peres de Faria
 Mato Grosso do Sul: Wilson Barbosa Martins (until 14 March); Ramez Tebet (from 14 March)
 Minas Gerais: Hélio Garcia 
 Pará: Jader Barbalho 
 Paraíba: 
 until 14 May: Wilson Braga
 15 May-14 June: Rivando Cavalcanti
 from 15 June: Milton Bezerra Cabral 
 Paraná: José Richa then João Elísio Ferraz de Campos 
 Pernambuco: Roberto Magalhães (until 14 May); Gustavo Krause (from 14 May)
 Piauí: Hugo Napoleão (until 14 May); Bona Medeiros (from 14 May)
 Rio de Janeiro: Leonel Brizola
 Rio Grande do Norte: José Agripino Maia (until 15 May); Radir Pereira de Araujo (from 15 March)
 Rio Grande do Sul: Jair de Oliveira Soares
 Rondônia: Ângelo Angelin 
 Santa Catarina: Esperidião Amin 
 São Paulo: André Franco Montoro 
 Sergipe: João Alves Filho

Vice governors
 Acre: Iolanda Ferreira Lima Fleming (until 14 May); vacant thereafter (from 14 May)
 Alagoas: José de Medeiros Tavares (until 14 May); vacant thereafter (from 14 May)
 Amazonas: Manoel Henriques Ribeiro (until 1 January); vacant thereafter (from 1 January)
 Bahia: Edvaldo de Oliveira Flores 
 Ceará: José Adauto Bezerra
 Espírito Santo: José Moraes (until 14 May); vacant thereafter (from 14 May)
 Goiás: Onofre Quinan (from 14 February); vacant thereafter (from 14 February)
 Maranhão: João Rodolfo Ribeiro Gonçalves 
 Mato Grosso: Wilmar Peres de Faria (until 14 May); vacant thereafter (from 14 May)
 Mato Grosso do Sul: Ramez Tebet (until 14 May); vacant thereafter (from 14 May)
 Minas Gerais: vacant
 Pará: Laércio Dias Franco 
 Paraíba: José Carlos da Silva Júnior (until 14 May); vacant thereafter (from 14 May)
 Paraná: João Elísio Ferraz de Campos (until 14 May); vacant thereafter (from 14 May)
 Pernambuco: Gustavo Krause Gonçalves Sobrinho (until 14 May); vacant thereafter (from 14 May)
 Piauí: José Raimundo Bona Medeiros (until 14 May); vacant thereafter (from 14 May)
 Rio de Janeiro: Darcy Ribeiro
 Rio Grande do Norte: Radir Pereira (until 14 May); vacant thereafter (from 14 May)
 Rio Grande do Sul: Cláudio Ênio Strassburger 
 Santa Catarina: Victor Fontana 
 São Paulo: Orestes Quércia (until 30 March); vacant (from 30 March)
 Sergipe: Antônio Carlos Valadares

Events 
 22 May A Hora do Espanto at Brazillan Movie Theater

Births
April 1 – Hugo Pessanha, judoka
April 29 – Monique Alfradique, actress
August 10 – Jucemar Gaucho, footballer
August 21 – Caio Narcio, politician and social scientist (died 2020)
August 24 – Fabiano Santacroce, Brazilian-born Italian footballer
December 30 – Babi Dewet, novelist and author

Deaths

See also 

1986 in Brazilian football
1986 in Brazilian television

References 

 
1980s in Brazil
Years of the 20th century in Brazil
Brazil
Brazil